"Youtopia" is a song by Dutch DJ and record producer Armin van Buuren. It features the vocals from American singer Adam Young, who is also the founder of electronica project Owl City. This song was released in the Netherlands by his label Armind as a digital download on 28 November 2011 and as a DVD on 13 December 2011. It was released as the sixth single from his fourth studio album Mirage. It debuted at number 68 on the Dutch Top 40 and number 137 on the Ultratop 50. This song was written by Benno de Goeij, Armin van Buuren and Adam Young.

Music video 
The music video to accompany the release of "Youtopia" was first released onto YouTube on 28 November 2011 through the label of Armada Music. As of March 2016, it has received over 2.3 million views.

Track listing 
 Digital downloads
 "Youtopia" – 3:59
 "Youtopia" (Blake Jarrell remix) – 6:09
 "Youtopia" (Tocadisco remix) – 6:19
 "Youtopia" (Michael Woods remix) – 7:29
 "Youtopia" (ReLocate remix) – 8:18
 CD single / Remixes EP
 "Youtopia" – 3:59
 "Youtopia" (Blake Jarrell remix) – 6:09
 "Youtopia" (Michael Woods remix) – 7:29
 Unreleased
 "Youtopia" (Original Mix) – 5:29

Charts

Weekly charts

Year-end charts

Release history

References 

2010 songs
Songs written by Armin van Buuren
2011 singles
Armin van Buuren songs
Songs written by Adam Young